Carlene Watkins (born June 4, 1952)  is an American actress best known for such television series and films as Best of the West, Bob, Dear John, The Tortellis and Tough Enough.

Filmography

References

External links

Living people
American television actresses
American film actresses
1952 births
Actresses from Hartford, Connecticut
21st-century American women